is a Japanese professional footballer who plays for YSCC Yokohama. He previously played for the Japanese national team. His wife is Japanese actress Rosa Kato.

Club career

Early years

Kyoto Purple Sanga
After his J1 League rookie season Purple Sanga were relegated to J2 League. However, the following season Matsui played a prominent role in helping his club finish first in J2, earning the club a promotion back to J1. In 2002 the club continued their success by having a strong season, finishing sixth in the league and winning the Emperor's Cup. The club's success and Matsui's increased exposure lead to Matsui being called up to the national team for the first time in 2003. However, his club was again relegated to J2 after the 2003 season, and could not earn a return to Division 1 after the 2004 season.

Le Mans
In 2004, after four and a half seasons in Kyoto, Matsui signed with Le Mans of Ligue 2 in France. Matsui chose Le Mans, then a second division club, over Lazio, one of the top clubs in Serie A, because he believed that the style of Italian football was too defensive.

In Japan, Matsui had been criticized for his small physique and mental weakness, but he adapted to the fast, physical style of French football by changing his style and holding on to the ball less. In his first season with Le Mans, he helped the club earn a runners-up finish in Ligue 2 and a promotion to Ligue 1. In 2005–06, in Matsui's first season playing in Ligue 1, Le Mans began undefeated in its first six matches of the season and finished 11th place in the league. Matsui was voted as the Player of the Month for January 2006.

Jean-Sébastien Grond of Football.fr has dubbed Matsui "the sun of Le Mans" (le soleil du Mans), while many Le Mans supporters and the media consider him the top player for the club.

In the 2006–07 season, Matsui appeared in 27 games and Le Mans finished 12th place in Ligue 1.

During the 2007–08 season, Matsui expressed desire to transfer to a new club at the end of the season, when his contract with Le Mans was set to expire.
Among the teams which were believed to have shown interested in signing him at the time were Catania, Genoa, Lazio and Torino of Serie A, Celtic and Rangers of the Scottish Premier League, Werder Bremen and Wolfsburg of the Bundesliga, and Lille of Ligue 1.

Saint-Étienne
At the conclusion of the season 2007–08 season, after having played for Le Mans for four consecutive years, Matsui announced his transfer to Saint-Étienne of Ligue 1 on a three-year signing.

In the beginning of the 2008–09 season Matsui was seeing very limited playing time, which was believed to have been due to his poor form combined with a rift with the manager, Laurent Roussey. However, on 10 November 2008 Roussey was released by Saint-Étienne due to the clubs poor performance. At the time of Roussey's release the club had lost five consecutive matches and sat in 18th place in the 20-team league, with a record of three wins, nine losses and a draw. During the club's poor slide, Saint-Étienne co-president Roland Romeyer criticized several players including Matsui, whom Romeyer had questioned if he was a body-double for the 'real' Japanese star Sainté had brought in from Le Mans in the summer.

On 11 November 2008, Saint-Étienne announced that Alain Perrin was appointed as the club's new manager. Perrin had led Olympique Lyonnais to the domestic double in the previous season by winning the Ligue 1 title and the French Cup.

In 2009, Matsui again moved to a new club in the Ligue 1, this time to Grenoble.

Grenoble
Matsui still showed his qualities by scoring four league goals in the campaign; one versus Lorient on 28 November 2009, two goals against Auxerre on 6 February 2010 and one versus Sochaux on 17 April 2010. However the season with Grenoble was reflected poorly as the team finished bottom of Ligue 1 and was relegated.

Tom Tomsk
During the summer transfer window in the Russian Premier League, Matsui moved to Siberian club FC Tom Tomsk on loan until the end of the Russian Championship of 2010. He played his first match for his new team on 11 September against Zenit Saint Petersburg and was substituted.

Dijon
On 5 July 2011, Matsui signed a two-year contract with the club in Dijon, a new entrant in France's Ligue 1.

Slavia Sofia
On 11 September 2012, Matsui joined Bulgarian A PFG club Slavia Sofia. He made his debut in a 2–0 home win over Lokomotiv Sofia on 23 September, coming on as a half-time substitute for Pavle Popara.

Lechia Gdańsk
On 3 July 2013, it was announced by Lechia Gdańsk that he had signed a contract for one year with an option of extension. On 22 July in his debut he scored goals in a 2–2 draw against Podbeskidzie Bielsko-Biała.

Júbilo Iwata
In 2014, Matsui returned to Japan and signed with J2 League club Júbilo Iwata. Júbilo achieved second place in 2015 season and was promoted to J1 League.

Odra Opole
On 8 August 2017, Matsui signed for Polish club playing in 2016–17 I liga, Odra Opole, for an undisclosed fee.

Yokohama FC
In 2018, Matsui returned to Japan and signed with J2 League club Yokohama FC.

International career

Matsui made his national team debut on 22 June 2003 with Japan at 2003 Confederations Cup against Colombia and scored his international goal against Angola on 11 October 2005. He also played for the U-23 national team at the 2004 Olympics.

Despite his performance at Le Mans, Matsui was not part of Zico's selection for the 2006 World Cup. Former Japan coach Philippe Troussier criticized the decision stating that "Matsui was selected as one of the best foreign players in France and didn't make it into the squad of 23 Zico selected, which is a pity given his form and experience."

Matsui was called up for the first time under Ivica Osim's reign to play in friendlies against Austria and Switzerland in September 2007. Matsui has continued to make national team appearances under Takeshi Okada, who has replaced Osim after Osim suffered a stroke in November 2007. In 2010, Matsu was selected Japan for 2010 World Cup. He played all 4 matches and Japan qualified to the knockout stage. He also played at 2011 Asian Cup. He played 2 matches and Japan won the champions. This Asian Cup was his last game for Japan. He played 31 games and scored 1 goal for Japan until 2011.

Career statistics

Club

International

Scores and results list Japan U23's and Japan's goal tally first, score column indicates score after each Matsui goal.

Honours
Kyoto Purple Sanga
 Emperor's Cup: 2002
 J2 League: 2001

Japan
 AFC Asian Cup: 2011
 Kirin Cup: 2008

Notes and references

External links

 
 
 Japan National Football Team Database
 
  
 
 AS Saint-Étienne Player Profile 
 Rising Sun News profile

1981 births
Living people
Association football wingers
Association football midfielders
Association football people from Kyoto Prefecture
Japanese footballers
Japan international footballers
J1 League players
J2 League players
J3 League players
Ligue 1 players
Ligue 2 players
Russian Premier League players
First Professional Football League (Bulgaria) players
Ekstraklasa players
Kyoto Sanga FC players
Le Mans FC players
AS Saint-Étienne players
Grenoble Foot 38 players
FC Tom Tomsk players
Dijon FCO players
PFC Slavia Sofia players
Lechia Gdańsk players
Júbilo Iwata players
Odra Opole players
Yokohama FC players
YSCC Yokohama players
2003 FIFA Confederations Cup players
2010 FIFA World Cup players
2011 AFC Asian Cup players
AFC Asian Cup-winning players
Olympic footballers of Japan
Footballers at the 2004 Summer Olympics
Footballers at the 2002 Asian Games
Asian Games medalists in football
Asian Games silver medalists for Japan
Japanese expatriate footballers
Expatriate footballers in France
Japanese expatriate sportspeople in France
Expatriate footballers in Russia
Japanese expatriate sportspeople in Russia
Expatriate footballers in Bulgaria
Expatriate footballers in Poland
Japanese expatriate sportspeople in Poland
Medalists at the 2002 Asian Games